Beat Okle is a Swiss mountain bike orienteer. Okle won a bronze medal in the long distance at the 2008 World MTB Orienteering Championships in Ostróda, and placed seventh in the middle distance and fourth with the Swiss relay team.

References

Swiss orienteers
Male orienteers
Swiss male cyclists
Mountain bike orienteers
Living people
Place of birth missing (living people)
Year of birth missing (living people)